Lyndon B. Johnson National Historical Park is a United States National Historical Park in central Texas about  west of Austin in the Texas Hill Country. The park protects the birthplace, home, ranch, and grave of Lyndon B. Johnson, 36th president of the United States. During Johnson's administration, the LBJ Ranch was known as the "Texas White House" because the President spent approximately 20% of his time in office there.

Districts and features
The park consists of two discontiguous areas, the Johnson City District and the LBJ Ranch District. The Johnson City District, located in Johnson City, contains the boyhood home of President Johnson and his grandparents' log cabin settlement, as well as the National Park Visitor Center. The ranch was the Johnson family retreat during his period of greatest influence, and is the site of the family cemetery. This gives the visitors a perspective of President Johnson's life when he was in office.

Johnson City
The Johnson City Unit is located on the south side of the city, with parking areas at the visitor center on Lady Bird Lane, and on United States Route 290 at N Street. The visitor center, located in a former hospital, provides an introduction to the park, exhibits and films about President Johnson and his wife Lady Bird. A short way north of the visitor center is the Johnson Boyhood Home, an 1880s Victorian house where he lived with his parents from age five. This house, restored by Johnson while he was president, was designated a National Historic Landmark in 1965.  West of the visitor center is the Johnson Settlement, a restored prairie in which are found the dogtrot house of Johnson's grandfather, and other 19th-century agricultural buildings.

LBJ Ranch

The ranch is located on the north side of United States Route 290, about fourteen miles west of Johnson City, with its main access through the Lyndon B. Johnson State Park and Historic Site, which lies between the highway and the south bank of the Pedernales River. The National Park Service lands lie north of the river. Among the sites preserved at the Ranch are the President's first school, his reconstructed birthplace, the Texas White House, and the Johnson Family Cemetery, where both President and Lady Bird Johnson are buried. Visitors take a self-guided auto driving tour from State Park visitor center; a permit is required. On August 2, 2018, the National Park Service announced that the Texas White House and Pool House were temporarily closed to visitors due to structural issues.

History
The park was authorized on December 2, 1969, as Lyndon B. Johnson National Historic Site and was redesignated as a National Historical Park on December 28, 1980. Present holdings are approximately 1,570 acres (6.4 km2), 674 acres (2.7 km2) of which are federal. The Johnson family continues to donate land to this property; their most recent gift was in April 1995.

Gallery

See also

List of National Historic Landmarks in Texas
List of residences of presidents of the United States
National Register of Historic Places listings in Blanco County, Texas
National Register of Historic Places listings in Gillespie County, Texas
Presidential memorials in the United States
Recorded Texas Historic Landmarks in Blanco County
Recorded Texas Historic Landmarks in Gillespie County

References

External links

 
 Lyndon B. Johnson National Historical Park official site
 Secondary National Park Service site on Johnson National Historic Site
 
"Life Portrait of Lyndon B. Johnson", from C-SPAN's American Presidents: Life Portraits, broadcast from the LBJ Ranch, November 12, 1999
The Johnsons of Johnson City, KPRC television special from about the LBJ Ranch, from the Texas Archive of the Moving Image

1969 establishments in Texas
Historic house museums in Texas
Houses on the National Register of Historic Places in Texas
National Historical Park
Museums in Blanco County, Texas
Museums in Gillespie County, Texas
National Historical Parks of the United States
National Park Service areas in Texas
National Register of Historic Places in Gillespie County, Texas
Presidential homes in the United States
Presidential museums in Texas
Protected areas established in 1969
Protected areas of Blanco County, Texas
Protected areas of Gillespie County, Texas
Ranches on the National Register of Historic Places in Texas
Birthplaces of individual people
Parks on the National Register of Historic Places in Texas
Tombs of presidents of the United States